Karol Gwóźdź (born 2 April 1987 in Katowice) is a Silesian poet, musician, DJ, composer and producer of ambient and electronic music, also known as Nail (gwóźdź is Polish for nail).

In 2012, he released a record on Psychonavigation Records label, and in 2019 on Dominance Electricity. The author is connected with his home region of Upper Silesia.

Discography

Albums 
 Karol Gwóźdź - Tamte Czasy, 2012

EPs 
 Nail - Revelation, 2019

Bibliography
 Myśli ukryte (Poetry), 2010

References

External links

1987 births
Living people
People from Katowice
Polish poetry
Ambient musicians
Polish musicians
20th-century Polish poets
20th-century Polish musicians
20th-century Polish male writers
People from Siemianowice Śląskie
People from Silesia
Silesian culture
Silesian language